Melle may refer to:

People 
 Basil Melle (1891–1966), South African cricketer
 Gil Mellé (1931–2004), American artist, jazz musician and film composer
 John van Melle (1887–1953), Dutch-born South African author
 Melle Mel (born 1961), American rapper
 Michael Melle (1930–2003), South African cricketer
 Sunnyi Melles (born 1958), German actress
 Werner von Melle (1853–1937), German mayor and senator of Hamburg

Places
 Canton of Melle, an administrative division of Deux-Sèvres, France
 Melle, Deux-Sèvres, a commune in Poitou-Charentes, France
 Mellé, Ille-et-Vilaine, a commune in Ille-et-Vilaine, Brittany, France
 Melle, Belgium, a municipality in East Flanders, Belgium
 Melle, Germany, a city in Osnabrück, Lower Saxony, Germany
 Melle, Piedmont, a municipality in Cuneo, Piedmont, Italy
 Melle, a location mentioned in a title Mansa Musa, "Emir of Melle"

Other
 Melle (film), a 2017 Indian (Malayalam) romantic film

See also
 Melles